WDUM-LD, virtual channel 41 (UHF digital channel 16), is a low-powered television station licensed to serve Philadelphia, Pennsylvania, United States. The station is owned by HC2 Holdings.

In June 2013, the then-WNAI-LP was slated to be sold to Landover 5 as part of a larger deal involving 51 other low-power television stations. Mako Communications sold its stations, including WDUM-LD, to HC2 Holdings in 2017.

Digital channels
The station's digital signal is multiplexed:

References

External links
HSN website

DUM-LP
Television channels and stations established in 2002
2002 establishments in New Jersey